Banque Saudi Fransi (BSF) (Arabic: البنك السعودي الفرنسي) is a Saudi Joint Stock company which was established in 1977.

The bank is affiliated with Crédit Agricole Corporate and Investment Bank. Credit Agricole CIB is a fully-fledged member of the Crédit Agricole Group, the second largest bank in France, and seventh amongst banks of the Eurozone by total equity. As of 2019, Banque Saudi Fransi had total assets of 178 billion SAR.

BSF has a banking network of about 120 branches across the Saudi Kingdom and employs over 3,000 staff. The bank's head office is located in Riyadh and the company has three regional offices in Jeddah, Al-Riyadh and Al-Khobar

History
Banque Saudi Fransi was established in accordance with the Royal Decree No. m. 32 dd 17 Jumada II 1397H 4 June 1977. Following the transfer of Banque de l'Indochine et de Suez operations in Saudi Arabia, Banque Saudi Fransi officially commenced its operations on 5 September 1989 under CR No. 1010073368 issued on 5 Sept 1989. Banque Saudi Fransi has a branch network of 120 branches.

In June 2012 Fitch Ratings has affirmed Banque Saudi Fransi's (BSF) Long-term Issuer Default Rating (IDR) at 'A' with a Stable Outlook and Short-term IDR at 'F1'.

Services
Banque Saudi Fransi offers financial services in corporate banking, commercial banking and retail banking including Islamic banking in accordance with the Islamic Sharia principles (Arabic: مبادىء الشريعة الإسلامية). The bank also provides investment services such as asset management and investment funds, in addition to providing brokerage services through subsidiary Saudi Fransi Capital

See also

 Crédit Agricole Corporate and Investment Bank
 List of companies of Saudi Arabia
 List of banks in Saudi Arabia

References

External links
Banque Saudi Fransi website
Fransi Tadawul
Saudi Credit Bureau

Saudi Stock Exchange (Tadawul)

Banks of Saudi Arabia
1977 establishments in Saudi Arabia
Companies listed on Tadawul
Companies based in Riyadh
Banks established in 1977